A1 News Channel (formerly TV Ballkan, A1 TV, A1 Report, and since closed) was an all news private television station in Tirana, Albania founded by media mogul Koco Kokedhima and owned by Shekulli newspaper.

History
A1 Report started as TV Ballkan in 2002 but quickly changed name to A1 TV. During that time period, A1 tried to attract a broader audience through shows such as Papparazzi and Hienat. It was also the only station with purely economic TV shows like A1 Biznes and Kapital. News is updated in real-time 24 hours a day. Since January 2007, A1 Televizion started airing movies and it probably has the latest and most famous movies of any local television in Albania, although it rarely advertises the fact, to comply with its 'new channel' image.

In the next few years, it changed logos several times and became A1 Report affiliated with Shqiptarja.com newspaper. In 2016, Carlo Bollino withdrew from this joint-venture and opened his own channel named Report TV. As a result, Kokedhima re-branded the channel as A1 News Channel.

A1 Report TV's broadcasting license has since been revoked by the Albanian Audiovisual Media Authority.

References

See also
Television in Albania

Defunct television networks in Albania
Television channels and stations established in 2002
Mass media in Tirana
2002 establishments in Albania